The Metropolitan Colliery is a coal mine located near Helensburgh, New South Wales owned by Peabody Energy. It was opened by in 1887 by the Cumberland Coal & Iron Mining Company. In 1965, the mine was purchased by Australian Iron & Steel. A proposed sale to South32 in 2016 was abandoned after the Australian Competition & Consumer Commission refused to approve it.

Coal is exported from Port Kembla with the mine connected to the Illawarra railway line via a spur line.

References

Coal mines in New South Wales
1887 establishments in Australia
Peabody Energy